Maykop Airport  is a civilian airport located on the north of Maykop, Russia. It has no solid-surface runway and is licensed for turboprop traffic only. Jet planes may land only in case of stable dry weather.

Airlines and destinations

Currently there is no scheduled service from this airport.

References

External links

Defunct airports
Airports built in the Soviet Union
Airports in Adygea